Paul Seedsman (born 22 January 1992) is a professional Australian rules footballer playing for the Adelaide Football Club in the Australian Football League (AFL).

Pre-AFL career
Seedsman attended Heany Park Primary School and Caulfield Grammar School in Melbourne and played junior football for the Rowville Football Club.

AFL career

Collingwood (2011–2015)
After playing out 2011 in Collingwood's VFL side, averaging 17 disposals, Seedsman made his debut in round 1 of the 2012 season, against . He established himself in the team in 2013, playing 17 matches and averaging 18.9 disposals as a rebounding defender capable of pushing onto the wing and forward. During the same season, he was also at the heart of a fallout between teammate Harry O'Brien and coach Nathan Buckley, with O'Brien reportedly taking issue with his teammates and Buckley calling Seedsman 'Lez' (a reference to his hairstyle at the time).

Seedsman injured his hip during the 2014 pre-season, requiring surgery. He returned to the side mid-season, before succumbing to an adductor injury ahead of Collingwood's round 19 match against .

He was officially traded to Adelaide on 19 October, having played 49 games for Collingwood.

Adelaide (2016–2023)
At the Crows Seedsman was able to complete his first full pre-season of training for the first time in three years. He played in all three games for Adelaide in the 2016 NAB Challenge, impressing in the third and final match against  where he collected 23 disposals and kicked a goal. Seedsman played his first game for Adelaide, and 50th overall, against  in round 1. After a good start, Seedsman injured himself in a tackle in the final quarter of the round 3 match against , but was still able to play the next week. Later in the season, in a clash against , Seedsman had a relatively easy set shot to put the Crows in front. Though he is known as a reliable kick, he was unable to kick the goal and the Crows lost the match by 26 points when Geelong scored the next four goals. Teammate Daniel Talia stressed after the match that the miss wasn’t responsible for their loss.

When he recovered, rather than going straight back into the AFL side he played his first SANFL match with the reserves team against , where he starred with 29 possessions and a game-high 10 clearances. He was brought back into the AFL side the next week to face off against his former side  for the first time. Late in the season Seedsman had a corked buttock and was forced to miss several AFL games. Due to this injury Seedsman was given a special permit to play in the Crows’ first ever SANFL final in spite of not playing enough SANFL matches throughout the season to qualify. He ended up being a late withdrawal for the elimination final, but was brought into the side to play in the semi-final against .

In 2017, Seedsman’s pre-season was interrupted by a groin injury. His recovery took longer than expected and meant he wasn’t able to play any AFL at the beginning of the season. It wasn’t until May that he was able to return to full training, then he started playing in the SANFL again in June.

After consistent from in the SANFL, Seedsman played his first AFL game for the season in round 19 against . Though he wasn’t able to keep his spot in the AFL side, he continued to impress in the SANFL, with an outstanding match against , getting a game-high 29 disposals and also kicking three goals. He was brought back into the AFL side for the final round match against , where he was good enough to keep his spot in the side going into the finals. When teammate Brodie Smith injured his ACL, Seedsman was seen as the most likely replacement given their similar playing styles and appearances, so he was more secure in his place in the side for the rest of the finals. Even though he’d only played four AFL matches for the season, and only two before the finals began, Seedsman was included in Adelaide’s team for the 2017 AFL Grand Final in which they were defeated by 48 points by the Richmond Football Club.

Seedsman played all 22 games in 2021 for the Crows and it was his best season of his career. Averaging 26 disposals and 5 marks Seedsman was able to showcase himself as one of the premier elite wingman in the AFL. Seedsman's career best season resulted in selection in the initial 40 man All Australian squad.

Statistics
 Statistics are correct to end of Round 23 2021

|- style="background:#eaeaea;"
! scope="row" style="text-align:center" | 2012
| style="text-align:center" | 
| 40 || 11 || 2 || 3 || 72 || 59 || 131 || 38 || 25 || 0.2 || 0.3 || 6.5 || 5.4 || 11.9 || 3.5 || 2.3
|-
! scope="row" style="text-align:center" | 2013
| style="text-align:center" | 
| 40 || 17 || 9 || 11 || 191 || 131 || 322 || 100 || 35 || 0.5 || 0.6 || 11.2 || 7.7 || 18.9 || 5.9 || 2.1
|- style="background:#eaeaea;"
! scope="row" style="text-align:center" | 2014
| style="text-align:center" | 
| 40 || 9 || 2 || 3 || 79 || 61 || 140 || 37 || 24 || 0.2 || 0.3 || 8.8 || 6.8 || 15.6 || 4.1 || 2.7
|-
! scope="row" style="text-align:center" | 2015
| style="text-align:center" | 
| 40 || 12 || 4 || 3 || 125 || 77 || 202 || 41 || 26 || 0.3 || 0.3 || 10.4 || 6.4 || 16.8 || 3.4 || 2.2
|- style="background:#eaeaea;"
! scope="row" style="text-align:center" | 2016
| style="text-align:center" | 
| 11 || 15 || 9 || 5 || 151 || 104 || 255 || 65 || 60 || 0.6 || 0.3 || 10.1 || 6.9 || 17.0 || 4.3 || 4.0
|-
! scope="row" style="text-align:center" | 2017
| style="text-align:center" | 
| 11 || 5 || 5 || 4 || 51 || 36 || 87 || 22 || 18 || 1.0 || 0.8 || 10.2 || 7.2 || 14.4 || 4.4 || 3.6
|- class="sortbottom"
|-
! scope="row" style="text-align:center" | 2018
| style="text-align:center" | 
| 11 || 19 || 13 || 13 || 233 || 157 || 390 || 77 || 49 || 0.6 || 0.6 || 12.2 || 8.2 || 20.5 || 4.0 || 2.5
|- style="background:#eaeaea;"
|-
! scope="row" style="text-align:center" | 2019
| style="text-align:center" | 
| 11 || 13 || 6 || 4 || 139 || 109 || 248 || 54 || 28 || 0.4 || 0.3 || 10.6 || 8.3 || 19.0 || 4.1 || 2.1
|- style="background:#eaeaea;"
|-
! scope="row" style="text-align:center" | 2020
| style="text-align:center" | 
| 11 || 9 || 4 || 5 || 79 || 65 || 144 || 24 || 28 || 0.4 || 0.5 || 8.7 || 7.2 || 16.0 || 2.6 || 3.1
|- style="background:#eaeaea;"
|-
! scope="row" style="text-align:center" | 2021
| style="text-align:center" | 
| 11 || 22 || 12 || 13 || 347 || 227 || 574 || 118 || 51 || 0.5 || 0.5 || 15.7 || 10.3 || 26.0 || 5.3 || 2.3
|- style="background:#eaeaea;"
! colspan=3| Career
! 132
! 66
! 64
! 1467
! 1026
! 2493
! 576
! 344
! 0.5
! 0.4
! 11.1
! 7.7
! 18.8
! 4.3
! 2.6
|}

See also
 List of Caulfield Grammar School people

References

External links

1992 births
Living people
Collingwood Football Club players
People educated at Caulfield Grammar School
Australian rules footballers from Victoria (Australia)
Eastern Ranges players
Adelaide Football Club players